Albino Crespi (30 January 1930 – 23 October 1994) was an Italian racing cyclist. He won stage 3 of the 1953 Giro d'Italia.

References

External links
 

1930 births
1994 deaths
Italian male cyclists
Italian Giro d'Italia stage winners
Place of birth missing
People from Busto Arsizio
Cyclists from the Province of Varese